Jougle Manoel Rodrigues or simply Jougle (born January 20, 1988) is a Brazilian footballer who plays as an attacking midfielder.

Career
He made his professional debut with Botafogo in 6-2 away win at Nova Iguaçu on April 8, 2007 in the Rio de Janeiro State League.

Honours
 Botafogo
Taça Rio: 2007

Contract
2 January 2007 to 31 December 2011.

References

External links
 sambafoot.com
 canalbotafogo.com
 CBF

1988 births
Living people
Brazilian footballers
Botafogo de Futebol e Regatas players
Nova Iguaçu Futebol Clube players
Duque de Caxias Futebol Clube players
Association football midfielders
Footballers from Rio de Janeiro (city)